Beata Szymańska (born in Puławy, Poland, on 29 January 1938) is a Polish poet, writer and philosopher.

Biography 
Beata Szymańska left the philosophy department of the Jagiellonian University and received her doctorate in philosophy in 1977. Several years she worked as research associate at the Jagiellonian University. In 1987, she published her book ‘’Berkeley znany i nieznany’’ that was focused

Beata Szymańska started publishing her writings of fiction in 1961.

Writings 
 Sny o porządku
 Sztychy reńskie
 Trzciny
 Immanuel Kant
 Poeta i nieznane
 Co to jest struktualizm
 Wiersze
 Berkeley znany i nieznany. — Wrocław etc.: Ossolineum, 1987. — 51 s. - (Nauka dla wszystkich /Pol. akad. nauk. Oddz. w Krakowie; N 407) Bibliogr.: s.51.
 Przeżycia i uczucia jako wartości filozofii polskiego modernizmu
 Filozofia Wschodu, praca zbiorowa pod red. Beaty Szymańskiej, 2001.
 Słodkich snów Europo, 2005.
 Chiński buddyzm chan, 2009.

Sources

References

External links 
 Beata Szymańska’s brief biography at the website of the Internet journal for philosophy “Nowa Krytyka” 
 

1938 births
Living people
People from Puławy
People from Lublin Voivodeship (1919–1939)
Polish women writers
Polish poets
Art writers
Polish art historians
Polish historians of philosophy
George Berkeley scholars
Jagiellonian University alumni
Women art historians